Nordrhein-Westfalen (F223) is the second ship of the s of the German Navy.

Background 
Nordrhein-Westfalen was designed and constructed by ARGE F125, a joint-venture of Thyssen-Krupp and Lürssen.

Construction and career
Nordrhein-Westfalen was laid down on 24 October 2012 and launched on 16 April 2015 in Hamburg. She was commissioned on 10 June 2020.

Gallery

References

External links 
 Seaforces.org

Baden-Württemberg-class frigates
2015 ships
Ships built in Hamburg